Murchison East railway station is located on the Tocumwal line in Victoria, Australia. It serves the town of Murchison East, and it opened on 1 September 1890 as Murchison.

History

Murchison East station opened on 1 September 1890, just over ten years are the railway line from Mangalore to Shepparton opened.

The station became a junction in the month that it opened, when the line to Rushworth opened, branching off at the southern (Up) end of the station. That line was later extended to Colbinabbin and Girgarre. In 1987, the Rushworth line closed.

In 1974, flashing light signals replaced hand gates at the Goulburn Valley Highway level crossing, located nearby in the Up direction of the station. In 2009, boom barriers were provided.

The station has the longest passing loop on the line, totalling 870 metres in length. However, in 2013, the loop was booked out of service due to poor track condition. A number of other sidings that serve a grain silo complex are located opposite the platform.

On 4 June 2014, the station building was destroyed by fire. The main timber station building had been fenced off, and a new passenger shelter constructed alongside.

As part of the Regional Rail Revival project to upgrade the Shepparton line, the platform was extended to accommodate VLocity trains. The crossing loop was also extended, enabling trains to pass each other. By August 2022, the project was completed, and included new lighting, seating, shelter and CCTV, as well an upgraded car park and upgraded paths leading to the station.

Closed station Wahring was located between Murchison East and Nagambie, while closed stations Arcadia and Toolamba were located between Murchison East and Mooroopna.

Platforms and services

Murchison East has one platform. It is serviced by V/Line Shepparton line services. Occasionally, some services terminate here instead of terminating at Shepparton.

Platform 1:
  services to Shepparton and Southern Cross

Gallery

References

External links
 
 Victorian Railway Stations gallery

Railway stations in Australia opened in 1880
Regional railway stations in Victoria (Australia)